Cold Springs is an unincorporated community in Umatilla County, Oregon, United States, south of the Columbia River in the Hermiston area.

The present-day Cold Springs was a station of the Oregon-Washington Railroad & Navigation Company, which is the Union Pacific Railroad today. Its elevation is 574 feet (175 m).

One of several geographic features in the area—including Cold Springs Wash, Cold Springs Reservoir and Cold Springs Canyon—that were likely named after a local spring, Cold Springs post office was established in 1880 and ran until 1883. The reservoir was formed in the early 1900s when the wash was dammed to provide storage for water diverted from the Umatilla River for irrigation.

See also
Cold Springs National Wildlife Refuge

References

Unincorporated communities in Umatilla County, Oregon
1880 establishments in Oregon
Populated places established in 1880
Unincorporated communities in Oregon